Culbert Levy Olson (November 7, 1876 – April 13, 1962) was an American lawyer and politician. A Democratic Party member, Olson was involved in Utah and California politics and was elected as the 29th governor of California from 1939 to 1943.

Early life and education
Olson was born in Fillmore, Utah, the son of Delilah Cornelia (née King) and George Daniel Olson, on November 7, 1876. Olson's mother was a suffragette and became the first female elected official in Utah. His first cousin was U.S. Senator William H. King, and both were descendants of Edmund Rice, an early immigrant to Massachusetts Bay Colony.

Olson's mother and father belonged to the Church of Jesus Christ of Latter-day Saints. However, Culbert was unconvinced of the existence of God, and became an atheist at the age of ten.

Leaving school at the age of 14, Olson worked briefly as a telegraph operator. In 1890, he enrolled at Brigham Young University in Provo, where he studied law and journalism.

Career 
Upon graduating at the age of 19 in 1895, Olson embarked on a career as a journalist with the Daily Ogden Standard. During the 1896 Presidential Election, Olson campaigned for Democratic candidate William Jennings Bryan. After the election, Olson moved briefly to Michigan, studying law at the University of Michigan, and then later to Washington, D.C., where he worked as a newspaper correspondent and secretary for the U.S. Congress. During his time in the capital, Olson attended law school at George Washington University, and he was admitted to the Utah Bar in 1901.

Utah and California Legislature
Olson moved back to Utah in 1901, settling in Salt Lake City to join a law practice. Building a reputation of defending trade unionists and political progressives, Olson was elected to the Utah State Senate in 1916. During his four years in the State Senate, Olson wrote and endorsed legislation to end child labor in the state, guarantee old age pensions, and expand government control of public utilities.

Olson declined to run again for the State Senate in the 1920 general election. Instead, Olson relocated to Los Angeles, California, beginning another law practice, where he again gained a reputation of investigating corporate fraud. Politics never remained far. Olson campaigned openly for Progressive Party candidate Robert La Follette in the 1924 Elections, and for Democrat Franklin Roosevelt in the 1932 Elections.

In 1934, in the middle of the Great Depression, Olson ran as a Democrat for the California State Senate, representing Los Angeles. During the 1934 state general elections, Olson campaigned for former Socialist Party member and Democratic nominee for governor, Upton Sinclair, participating in Sinclair's End Poverty in California campaign. While Sinclair lost the gubernatorial election to Republican Frank Merriam, Olson was elected to the State Senate that year.

While in the California State Senate, the second state legislature he was elected to, Olson openly supported Roosevelt's New Deal policies towards the unemployed. Seeing large business interests as a barrier to change, Olson wrote the Olson Oil Bill to cut down oil company monopolies in the state.

With the open support of President Roosevelt, Olson ran for governor of California in the 1938 general elections against conservative Republican and anti-labor incumbent Governor Frank Merriam. Merriam, known for suppressing the 1934 Longshore Strike and his conservative fiscal policies, was a highly unpopular candidate among progressives and unionists, with even conservative Republicans angered by his 1935 tax reforms. Merriam lost soundly to Olson. He was the first Democrat to win the governorship since James Budd's election in 1894, breaking the 40-year Republican dynasty over the governorship.

Governor of California
Olson was inaugurated as California's twenty-ninth executive on January 2, 1939, and was the first Democrat to serve as governor of California in 40 years. In his inaugural address, Olson pointed at progressives and the Left for his inspiration, citing that "[t]hey point the way forward - toward the achievement of the aspiration of the people for an economy that will afford general employment, abundant production, equitable distribution, social security and old age retirement, which our country, with its ample resources, great facilities and the genius of its people, is capable of providing."

Olson refused to say "so help me God" during his oath of office to state Supreme Court Justice William H. Waste. Olson remarked earlier to Justice Waste that "God couldn't help me at all, and that there isn't any such person." Instead, Olson said, "I will affirm."

Olson's tenure in the governorship got off to a rocky start. He collapsed four days after his inauguration, and doctors discovered that he was suffering from an ailing heart. On top of personal health matters, Kate Jeremy Olson, the Governor's wife of nearly thirty-nine years, died shortly after he assumed the office.

Contrasting with the conservative policies of Governor Frank Merriam, Olson promoted friendly relations with the state's labor unions. In September 1939, he officially pardoned Tom Mooney, a labor activist and political prisoner accused of plotting the 1916 Preparedness Day Bombing in San Francisco. Olson cited scant evidence against Mooney as the reason for his pardon. The next month, Olson pardoned Mooney's alleged accomplice, Warren Billings.

Olson's relationship with the California State Legislature was often bitter. With conservative Democrats controlling the Assembly, and business-friendly Republicans in the Senate, Olson had little room to promote his New Deal politics, while the Legislature remained wary of Olson's leftist agenda. In the first year of his governorship, Olson's proposed budget was cut by nearly 100 million dollars, and his proposal of compulsory universal health insurance for every Californian was defeated. The Legislature also defeated legislation to raise income, bank and corporate taxes, as well as Olson's bills to regulate lobbyists and reform the state penal system. State-subsidized relief for farmers was cut nearly in half. Olson installed a telephone hotline to the Legislature to get immediate word of lawmakers' positions on bills in committee or on the floor for a vote.

During his tenure, Olson grew increasingly critical of the Roman Catholic Church and its presence in the state educational system, and raised the ire of Archbishops John J. Cantwell of Los Angeles and John J. Mitty of San Francisco. A secular atheist, Olson was disturbed by the state legislature's passage of two bills in 1941, one to give free transportation to students attending Catholic schools, and the other to release Catholic children from public schools in the middle of the school day in order to attend catechism, leaving the schools and other students idle until the Catholic students' returned. Olson signed the first bill into law, later citing the enormous pressure of the Catholic Church on his office and on state lawmakers, but he vetoed the second ("early release") bill.

After the Japanese attack on Pearl Harbor in December 1941, and the entry of the United States into the Second World War, many in California feared a Japanese invasion. In the wake of the attack, Olson urged calm from Californians. In a plea for racial tolerance, broadcast on December 14, he stated he had assurances from "every racial group" of their loyalty and devotion to the United States, even reading a telegram he had received from a Japanese citizen. Olson attempted to revoke the business licenses of "enemy alien" Japanese in California. (Japanese immigrants were prohibited by law from becoming U.S. citizens and were therefore permanent aliens, although many had resided in California for decades.) On February 19, 1942, President Franklin Roosevelt issued Executive Order 9066, allowing U.S. military commanders to create zones from which "any or all persons may be excluded." Based on that, all West Coast Japanese Americans, including American-born Nisei and Sansei, in addition to the non-citizen Issei, were forcibly relocated to isolated internment camps over the next several months.

The pro-internment recommendations of General John L. DeWitt (head of the Western Defense Command) were embarrassing for Governor Olson. On February 2, 1942, the Governor, following a meeting with Dewitt, said that mass evacuation would not be necessary; DeWitt pursued his plans regardless of Olson's disagreement. However, despite his preference for excluding Japanese Americans only from "coastal California", and allowing adult men to work in labor camps as an alternative to incarceration, Olson wholeheartedly supported the eviction. A long-time supporter of nearly every Roosevelt position on economics, politics and foreign policy, on March 6, 1942, he testified before a U.S. House committee on the danger of allowing Japanese Americans to remain free: "Because of the extreme difficulty in distinguishing between loyal Japanese Americans, and there are many who are loyal to this country, and those other Japanese whose loyalty is to the Mikado. I believe in the wholesale evacuation of the Japanese people from coastal California."

By the 1942 general elections, Republicans were accusing Olson of blatant partisan politics during wartime, citing Olson's often bitter divides with the State Legislature. The Republican Party nominated California Attorney General Earl Warren as the party's nominee for the governorship. Warren, a centrist Republican, campaigned as a moderate voice that would appeal to both liberals and conservatives during a time of war, where California was considered as a possible front line, while accusing Olson of being an uncompromising, left-wing Democrat.

Olson lost to Warren by a large margin. In later years, Olson blamed "the active hostility of a certain privately owned power corporation and the Roman Catholic Church in California" for his defeat.

Later career
Following his departure from the governorship, Olson returned to law. He regained the public spotlight again in the 1950s, when the Legislature voted to exempt Catholic schools from real estate taxes. Olson filed an amicus curiae brief to the state Supreme Court, asking the court to explain how the state's exemption of a religious organization from civil taxes was constitutional.

In 1957, Olson became president of the United Secularists of America, a body of secularists, atheists, and freethinkers.

Death 
Olson died in Los Angeles on April 13, 1962, aged 85. Olson is buried in Forest Lawn Memorial Park Cemetery, Glendale, California.

See also
 Earl King, Ernest Ramsay, and Frank Conner murder case

References

External links

Spartacus Educational profile
Join California Culbert L. Olson

1876 births
1962 deaths
George Washington University Law School alumni
Brigham Young University alumni
Democratic Party governors of California
American atheism activists
California lawyers
Democratic Party California state senators
Former Latter Day Saints
Internment of Japanese Americans
Democratic Party Utah state senators
Burials at Forest Lawn Memorial Park (Glendale)
Critics of the Catholic Church
University of Michigan Law School alumni
20th-century American politicians